Figwort usually refers to plants in the genus Scrophularia.

Some other plants - mainly Lamiales formerly or still in the Scrophulariaceae - are also called "figwort". These include:
 Euphrasia officinalis (Red eyebright)
 Veronica officinalis (Common speedwell)
 Veronica anagallis-aquatica (Water speedwell)
 Gratiola officinalis (Common hedgehyssop) 
 Bacopa monnieri (Coastal waterhyssop) 
 Scoparia dulcis (Sweet broomweed) 
 Ilysanthes riparia (False pimpernel)